Mehdi Shabzendedar Jahromi is an Iranian Shia jurist and member of the Guardian Council."

Early life 
He is the son of the late Ayatollah Haj Sheikh Hussein Shabzendehdar Jahromi, a student of the late Ayatollah Ruhollah Khomeini, and the grandson of Sheikh Gholam Hossein Sharii Shirazi.

Career 
He is the principal of the Baghiyato-Allah Institute which trains students in the field of Jurisprudence and Principles. He is a former member of the Society of Seminary Teachers of Qom and the Supreme Council of the Seminary. He was the Qom Seminary Teacher. Following the demise of Gholamreza Rezvani in April 2013, Mehdi Shab Zende Dar by the command of seyyed Ali Khamenei, he became a member of the Guardian Council jury in July 2013. The Guardian Council is a member of the Expediency Discernment Council.

Education 
In , Shab Zende Dare Jahromi began his seminary studies and preliminary lessons with his father Hossin Shab Zende Dare Jahromi, and studied under Seyyed Hassan Taheri Khoramabadi, Ali Meshkini, Mohammad Momen, Ahmad Jannati, Ja'far Sobhani, late Moslehi Araki and Setoodeh. He studied philosophy and theology from the Seyyed Reza Sadr, Hassan Hasanzadeh Amoli, Ebrahim Amini, Abdollah Javadi-Amoli and Ansari Shirazi. His teachers in lessons and principles of jurisprudence were Kazem Garoubi Tabrizi, Morteza Haeri Yazdi, Hossein Vahid Khorasani, Mirza Jawad Tabrizi and Haj Moussa Shobeiri Zanjani. Shab Zende Dar's Qom Seminary level courses have been taught for nearly 15 years, teaching the principles of Fiqh.

Activities 
 Membership in the Society of Seminary Teachers of Qom
 Member of the Guardian Council constitution
 Representing the Supreme Council of the Board of Trustees of the International Center for Islamic Sciences and seminaries abroad
Membership in the Advisory Council and Guardian Council of Islamic jurisprudence
 member of the Supreme Council of Seminary

References 

1953 births
Living people
People from Jahrom
Society of Seminary Teachers of Qom members
Members of the Assembly of Experts
Members of the Guardian Council